Foster Draw is a valley and stream tributary to Animas Creek within Hidalgo County, New Mexico.

Foster Draw may be named after Stephen Clark Foster, the translator and sometime scout for Lt. Col. Philip St. George Cooke and the Mormon Battalion expeditions officers and it lies along the course of Cooke's Wagon Road.

References

Landforms of Hidalgo County, New Mexico
Rivers of New Mexico
Rivers of Hidalgo County, New Mexico
Valleys of New Mexico